Amrom Harry Katz (August 15, 1915 – February 10, 1997) was an American physicist who specialized in aerial reconnaissance as well as satellite technology.

Katz developed methods for aerial reconnaissance supported by space satellites. His work was used by military intelligence, and for locating disaster victims. On August 18, 2000 he was acknowledged as one of the ten Founders of the National Reconnaissance Office.

Between 1954 and 1969 he worked for the RAND Corporation in Santa Monica, California.

References

1915 births
1997 deaths
20th-century American physicists
Aerial reconnaissance
RAND Corporation people